Kukup Island is an island in Pontian District, Johor, Malaysia.

Geology
The island is predominantly covered by mangrove and mudflat. It is surrounded by 8 km2 of mudflat. Recently (2018) it was rumored that the island holds large deposits of gold.

Geography
The island is located around 1 km offshore from Johor mainland. The island spans over an area of 6.472 km2.

Ecology
The island consists of various wildlife animals, such as monkeys, wild boars, mudskippers etc.

History
Kukup Island status as a remote hinterland changed in the 1990s when scientists began focusing on the island's biodiversity a unique ecological characteristics. In the interest of preserving this unique habitat, Kukup Island was gazetted a national park on 27 March 1997 under the Johor State Park Corporation Enactment 1989. On 31 January 2003, this island was granted the status of a "Wetland of International Importance", or Ramsar site, by the Geneva-based Ramsar Convention Bureau.

See also
 List of islands of Malaysia
 List of Ramsar wetlands of international importance

References

External links

 Tourism Malaysia—Kukup Island, Johor National Park
 Pulau Kukup, Johor National Park

Islands of Johor
Pontian District
Ramsar sites in Malaysia